John Baylon (born 6 November 1965) is a Filipino judoka who has competed in the Summer Olympics and a multi-medalist in the Southeast Asian Games.

Career
He trained in Judo in Japan at the Kōdōkan where he obtained his Judo black belt.

He competed at the 1988 Summer Olympics and the 1992 Summer Olympics.

Baylon has won a total of nine gold medals in the Southeast Asian Games, first competing in the regional tournament in the 1980s. His first gold medal in the games was in the 1991 edition which was hosted in Manila. He was the flagbearer of the Philippine Southeast Asian Games delegation in 2007. In 2002, Baylon decided to take up Brazilian jiu-jitsu and obtained his black belt in the discipline from Toshiyuki Wado in 2008. He also won medals in Judo at the World Masters, and Asian Games.

In the 2011 edition, he failed to win a gold after he was defeated by Vietnamese judoka, Hai Long To in the 81 kg category semifinal. This led to him announcing his retirement from competitive judo.

Retirement
After his retirement, he went on to become a coach in Brazilian jiu-jitsu and Judo based in Metro Manila.

References

External links
 

1965 births
Living people
Filipino male judoka
Olympic judoka of the Philippines
Judoka at the 1988 Summer Olympics
Judoka at the 1992 Summer Olympics
Place of birth missing (living people)
Judoka at the 1998 Asian Games
Judoka at the 2002 Asian Games
Judoka at the 2006 Asian Games
Judoka at the 2010 Asian Games
Asian Games competitors for the Philippines